Allophylus bullatus is a species of plant in the family Sapindaceae. It is found in Cameroon, Nigeria, and São Tomé and Príncipe. Its natural habitat is subtropical or tropical moist montane forests. It is threatened by habitat loss.

References

bullatus
Vulnerable plants
Taxonomy articles created by Polbot